Oncideres magnifica is a species of beetle in the family Cerambycidae. It was described by Martins in 1981. It is known from French Guiana and Brazil.

References

magnifica
Beetles described in 1981